Francine Pelletier may refer to:

 Francine Pelletier (writer) (born 1959), Canadian science fiction author
 Francine Pelletier (journalist) (born c. 1955), Canadian television and print journalist